Karapınar is a village in the Sultandağı District, Afyonkarahisar Province, Turkey. Its population is 648 (2021). Before the 2013 reorganisation, it was a town (belde).

References

Villages in Sultandağı District